Rosenbaum Contemporary is an American post-war, modern, and contemporary art gallery with two locations based in South Florida. It was founded in 1979 by father and son, Marvin and Howard Rosenbaum. They are a member of the Fine Art Dealers Association and exhibit artwork internationally in contemporary art fairs.

History
In 1979, Rosenbaum Contemporary opened their first gallery on Banyan Trail in Boca Raton, Florida with the intentions of representing emerging and established artists. In 2012, Howard Rosenbaum's daughter, Lara Rosenbaum, joined the family business when she opened the gallery's second location inside the St. Regis Bal Harbour Hotel in Miami Beach.  Later in 2013, the gallery moved to a more spacious location on Yamato Road

In 2015, during Art Basel Miami Beach, Rosenbaum Contemporary presented the work of Omar Hassan, debuting his art series Breaking Through for the first time in the United States. During the performance piece, the former-boxer dips his boxing gloves in paint and expressively punches color onto the canvas.

In 2016, Rosenbaum Contemporary collaborated with artist Helidon Xhixha in the inauguration of the public sculpture titled Endless Melody.  The artwork was installed in the Melody Tower Plaza Garden in downtown Miami.

Notable artists
Exhibited artists include:

 Donald Baechler
 Bill Beckley
 Vanessa Beecroft
 Mateo Blanco
 Fernando Botero
 Alexander Calder
 John Chamberlain
 George Condo
 Robert Cottingham
 CRASH
 Willem de Kooning
 Jim Dine
 Jean Dubuffet
 Nancy Dwyer
 Ron English
 Sam Francis
 Cleve Gray
 Omar Hassan
 Damien Hirst
 David Hockney
 Robert Indiana
 Alex Katz
 Mira Lehr
 Roberto Matta
 Raphael Mazzucco
 Joan Miró
 Elizabeth Murray
 Louise Nevelson
 Kenneth Noland
 Pablo Picasso
 Robert Polidori
 Simon Procter
 Robert Rauschenberg
 Richard Serra
 Hunt Slonem
 Antoni Tàpies
 Manolo Valdés
 Albert Watson
 Tom Wesselmann
 Helidon Xhixha

References

External links

Art galleries established in 1979
Contemporary art galleries in the United States